Lionel Richie is an American R&B and pop singer, who has released 10 studio albums, three live albums, and seven compilation albums. Formerly the lead vocalist of The Commodores, Richie began a solo career in the early 1980s and has released over 40 singles, five of which became number-one hits on the US Billboard Hot 100.

Richie's first three studio albums have all been certified "Multi-Platinum" by the Recording Industry Association of America. His second album, Can't Slow Down, is his most successful, being certified 10× Platinum (i.e. Diamond) in the US. The album spent 59 consecutive weeks inside the Billboard Top 10 (including the entire year of 1984) and a total of 160 weeks (over three years) on the Billboard 200 chart. It became the third best-selling album of 1984, and eventually sold over 20 million copies worldwide.

In addition to multiple pop, R&B, and adult contemporary hit singles, two of his singles reached the Top 30 of the Hot Country Singles & Tracks chart (now Hot Country Songs). "Deep River Woman", which features country music group Alabama, was a Top 10 hit on the country music charts in 1987.

Richie's tenth studio album, Tuskegee, was released in 2012 and peaked at number one on the US Billboard 200, making it his third number one album on the chart.

Albums

Studio albums

Live albums

Compilation albums

Singles

Other charted songs

Music videos

Notes
C ^ Did not enter the Hot 100 but charted on Bubbling Under Hot 100 Singles.

References

Richie, Lionel
Richie, Lionel
Discography